Leigh Bishop (2 March 1922 – 26 February 2016) was an Australian international lawn bowler.

Bowls career

World Championships
Bishop won a silver medal in the fours with Don Woolnough, Barry Salter and Keith Poole and a bronze medal in the team event (Leonard Trophy), at the 1976 World Outdoor Bowls Championship in Johannesburg.

Personal life
He served in the Royal Australian Navy during World War II, and played a variety of sports before settling on lawn bowls in 1951.

He died in 2016.

References

1922 births
2016 deaths
Australian male bowls players
Royal Australian Navy personnel of World War II
People from Ulverstone, Tasmania